Tamirat Tola Abera (born 11 August 1991) is an Ethiopian long-distance runner who competes in track, road and cross country events. He won the bronze medal in the 10,000 metres at the 2016 Rio Olympics. Tamirat competed in the marathon at the 2017 and 2022 World Athletics Championships, earning silver and gold respectively, and setting a championship record in 2022.

Career
Tamirat Tola made his half marathon debut in Agadir in 2013, and then quickly improved to win the České Budějovice Half Marathon in a time of 1:02:04 hours. He improved his best further to 1:01:27 at the Ústí nad Labem Half Marathon, then made a fast marathon debut with a time of 2:06:17 hours for fourth at the high-profile Dubai Marathon.

Tamirat won the Ethiopian national title in cross country in 2015 which led to his selection for the 2015 IAAF World Cross Country Championships. Making his international debut, he took sixth place in the senior race which helped the Ethiopians narrowly take the team title on equal points with Kenya (Muktar Edris, Hagos Gebrhiwet and Atsedu Tsegay were the other point-scoring team members). He had mixed fortunes in the rest of the season: he failed to finish the 2015 Berlin Marathon but set bests of 60:08 minutes for the half marathon and 27:22.64 minutes for the 10,000 metres.

Several good performances on the circuit in late 2015/early 2016 led to wins at the Cross Internacional de Itálica, Cross International de la Constitución, Boclassic and Great Ethiopian Run. He was part of the national team setup in 2016, this time for the 2016 IAAF World Half Marathon Championships. He was again an essential team member with his fifth-place finish in a time of 60:06 minutes, pushing Ethiopia (through Abayneh Ayele, Tamirat, and Mule Wasihun) to the team silver medals.

In 2017, Tamirat participated in the World Championships held in London, earning the silver medal in the marathon with a time of 2:09:49.

In 2022, he went one better in the marathon at the World Championships in Eugene, Oregon, winning gold and setting a championship record of 2:05:36 in the process.

Achievements

International competitions

Circuit wins
 2013: Hawassa Half Marathon (ETH), České Budějovice Half Marathon
 2015: BOclassic
 2017: Dubai Marathon, Prague Half Marathon
 2018: BOclassic
 2019: Bogotá Half Marathon
 2021: Amsterdam Marathon
 2022: Trento Half Marathon (ITA)

Personal bests
 10,000 metres – 26:57.33 (Eugene, OR2016)
 10 kilometres – 28:12 (Bolzano 2018)
 Half marathon – 59:37 (Prague 2017)
 Marathon – 2:03:39 (Amsterdam 2021)

References

External links

Living people
1991 births
Ethiopian male long-distance runners
Ethiopian male marathon runners
Athletes (track and field) at the 2016 Summer Olympics
Olympic athletes of Ethiopia
Olympic bronze medalists for Ethiopia
Medalists at the 2016 Summer Olympics
Olympic bronze medalists in athletics (track and field)
World Athletics Championships medalists
World Athletics Championships athletes for Ethiopia
20th-century Ethiopian people
21st-century Ethiopian people